Elwood Gilbert "Woody" Pitzer (November 3, 1910 – August 22, 2001) was an American professional basketball and minor league baseball player. He played for the Columbus Athletic Supply in the National Basketball League and averaged 4.5 points per game. In college, he played both basketball and baseball for Wittenberg University. 

In addition to basketball, Pitzer played minor league baseball for two years after college graduation. He competed for the Bartlesville Reds in 1935 and the Bartlesville Bucs in 1936, teams in the Cincinnati Reds farm system. In 127 career games, Pitzer batted .295 and hit one home run.

References

1910 births
2001 deaths
American men's basketball players
Bartlesville Bucs players
Bartlesville Reds players
Baseball players from Ohio
Basketball players from Ohio
Columbus Athletic Supply players
Forwards (basketball)
Guards (basketball)
High school basketball coaches in the United States
Sportspeople from Springfield, Ohio
United States Navy personnel of World War II
Wittenberg Tigers baseball players
Wittenberg Tigers men's basketball players